The Diocese of Carcabia is a titular see of the Roman Catholic Church.

Historically, three bishops are mentioned being from Carcabia:
Victorian participated in the Council of Cabarsussi, held in 393 by Maximianus, a dissident sect of the Donatists, and they signed the acts; he was sentenced, along with the other bishops, in the Donatist Council of Bagai of 394.
At the Council of Carthage the Donatist bishop Donatian was an attendee. The diocese at that time had no Catholic bishops.
Simplicio attended the synod in Carthage in 484 called by the Vandal king Huneric, after which Simplicio was exiled.

Today Carcabia survives as titular bishopric; the current bishop is Manuel Nin, Apostolic Exarch of Greece.

References 

Catholic titular sees in Africa
Ancient Berber cities
Roman towns and cities in Tunisia
Archaeological sites in Tunisia